Mehmet Burak Erdoğan (born 1972) is a Turkish mathematician, scientist, and professor of mathematics. He is a member of the University of Illinois Urbana-Champaign (UIUC) Mathematics Department.

Education
Burak Erdoğan was born in 1972. He attended the high school Kayseri Fen Lisesi in Kayseri, Turkey, for two years before moving to İzmir, Turkey where he finished the high school Atatürk Lisesi in 1989. He ranked third in the country-wide university entrance exams. 
He graduated from Bilkent University Electrical and Electronics Engineering in Ankara in 1994. He finished his MSc  in Mathematics department of the same university under the supervision of Iossif Vladimirovich Ostrovskii in 1996. He received his PhD  in Mathematics under the supervision of Thomas Wolff at Caltech in 2001. He was the last PhD student of Wolff, who died in the last year of Erdoğan's PhD work.

Academic career
He was a postdoc at the Institute for Advanced Study between 2001-2002 and a visiting assistant professor at University of California, Berkeley between 2002-2004. Since then he is a faculty member in UIUC Mathematics Department.

He has been an active researcher, having published more than 50 scientific manuscripts with more than 600 citations. He raised 5 PhD students.

Research areas
His research interests include  Harmonic Analysis and Dispersive PDE.

Representative scientific publications 
 Book: Erdoğan, M.B.; Tzirakis N. "Dispersive partial differential equations, wellposedness and applications", London Mathematical Society Student Texts 86, Cambridge  University Press, 2016.

 Erdog̃an, M. Burak A bilinear Fourier extension theorem and applications to the distance set problem. Int. Math. Res. Not. 2005, no. 23, 1411-1425. 

 Chapman, Jeremy; Erdoğan, M. Burak; Hart, Derrick; Iosevich, Alex; Koh, Doowon Pinned distance sets, k-simplices, Wolff's exponent in finite fields and sum-product estimates. Math. Z. 271 (2012), no. 1-2, 63-93.

 Erdoğan, Mehmet Burak; Tzirakis, Nikolaos Global smoothing for the periodic KdV evolution. Int. Math. Res. Not. IMRN 2013, no. 20, 4589-4614.

References

External links
 

Turkish mathematicians
1972 births
Living people
University of Illinois Urbana-Champaign faculty
People from Kayseri
People from İzmir
Bilkent University alumni